Navàs is a town and municipality in the province of Barcelona in Catalonia, Spain.

References

External links
 Government data pages 

Municipalities in Bages